Size Matters is the fifth album by the American alternative metal band Helmet, released in 2004 on Interscope Records. It is the first new album since the band ended with a bitter break-up in 1998, and it is also their final album to be released through Interscope.

Background
Page Hamilton, the band's founder and chief songwriter, is the only original member appearing on the album. Therefore, some fans object to it being called "Helmet" and consider it to be a Page Hamilton solo project. According to Hamilton, founding members John Stanier (drums) and Henry Bogdan (bass) both declined the invitation to reunite. Stanier even publicly criticized Hamilton and the new Helmet in 2004.

Despite any objections, the album carries on in the Helmet tradition with Hamilton's trademark staccato sound. Hamilton said to Deseret News in October 2004, "I can see why John is upset. There are some people who feel that only the original lineup can constitute a group. But then there are others who don't care. What I'm more concerned with is the fact that the music is good." He further added, "I'm not trying to pull the wool over anyone's eyes. This is a new Helmet."

The album was recorded as a three-piece with ex-White Zombie drummer John Tempesta and Chris Traynor (guitarist on the Aftertaste tour) on bass. After recording was done, Anthrax bassist Frank Bello was brought in so Traynor could return to guitar for live performances. Bello is included in promotional images from the Size Matters era, and several reviewers mistakenly claimed that he performed on the album. Unlike with previous Helmet albums, Size Matters was made with the assistance of digital editing software pro tools.

Composition

Music and lyrics 
Many of the album's s lyrics were inspired by Hamilton's year long relationship with actress Winona Ryder in 2003. Hamilton has since commented that Ryder was a fan of Helmet and that she has heard the album, saying in 2007 that she didn't like their next album Monochrome because "it didn’t sound like her favorite song on Aftertaste, or her favorite song on even Size Matters." "Smart" (a.k.a. "Opportunity"), "Enemies" and "Unwound", were originally recorded as Gandhi tracks, Page Hamilton's previous band.

Artwork
The album cover features a black and white photo of a young girl holding a magnifying glass. The photo was taken by Frances Murray. Regarding the cover, Page Hamilton said in a 2005 interview, "the initial attraction was that it was a beautiful photo, this sort of innocence and open mindedness that kids have about things. She's got a magnifying glass up to her eye so you can see her eyeball enlarged. Kids I believe start out with a natural inquisitiveness and a natural open mindedness, and they will do the right thing. Eventually if we continue to fill them full of shit they will be swayed."

Release 
The album was scheduled to be released on September 14, 2004, but was pushed back to October 5 after Hamilton broke his collarbone in a mountain biking accident, delaying the band's touring schedule that was supposed to begin three days after the planned release.

The album debuted at #121 on the Billboard 200, selling 9,723 copies in its first week. Size Matters had two singles; "See You Dead" and "Unwound". The track "Throwing Punches" was also included on the film soundtrack for Underworld, and "Crashing Foreign Cars" was featured in the video game Need for Speed: Underground 2.

Critical reception 
Size Matters was met with "mixed or average" reviews from critics. At Metacritic, which assigns a weighted average rating out of 100 to reviews from mainstream publications, it received an average score of 52 based on eight reviews. At Pitchfork writer David Raposa gave the album a mixed review. He criticized the band's change in sound writing, "Helmet attempt to diversify their portfolio, offering dynamics and approachable melodies and other types of listener-friendly capitulations one wouldn't associate with the folks that dropped Meantime and 'Unsung'."

Johnny Loftus of AllMusic gave the album 3 stars and wrote in his review, "Size Matters emphasizes for the bloated alt-metal elite what it means to have craft and a little self-control. It isn't necessarily memorable, but as an exercise in measured, even artistic rage, it's classic Hamilton." Josh Zanger of LAS Magazine explained, "Size Matters seems to come up a little short in certain areas though. The overall sound is a bit too polished and loses some of the raw power edge that previous albums rode to critical success. This slickness also makes the weaker songs forgettable and bland, and a few of the choruses are forced into overextensions. At times, elated melodies contradict the darker pounding force of previously established riffs and sound like unnatural ideas that never fully blossomed." In Music We Trust also noted the more polished sound, in addition to the lineup changes, stating in their review, "Page Hamilton has embarked on a comeback with Size Matters, but, like Dave Mustaine, he keeps the band name yet changes the entire lineup sans himself. Armed with Frank Bello (Anthrax), John Tempesta (White Zombie), and Chris Traynor (Orange 9mm), the '04 Helmet lineup reads like the New York Metal All-Star team."

In a review with Rolling Stone, Christian Hoarde gave the release 2 stars out of 5, explaining, "On their first disc in seven years, the manicured riffs remain, but the sludge is so overbearing that anyone born during the Eighties will wonder what once made them special." Scene Point Blank wrote in their November 2004 review that, "On one hand, we have songs such as 'Smart', 'Everybody Loves You', and 'Throwing Punches'. These songs find Hamilton utilizing his 'red-neck truck driver' voice. Musically, these songs feature the more aggressive riffs and fast-paced drumming that rekindle thoughts of Helmet material found on Strap it On. On the other hand, we have 'Crashing Foreign Cars' and 'Unwound' that feature the softer and more accessible Hamilton. As a whole, these types of songs are much more prevalent on Size Matters." They concluded their review by stating, "while it's nice to have a solid rock band like Helmet around again, the cohesion from albums like Meantime and Betty is lacking on this latest effort. But despite the sub par return endeavor, Helmet still executes alternative metal superior to that of the 'nu-metal' parade that they involuntarily influenced."

Legacy
In 2011, Decibel Magazine gave the album a critical reappraisal, and claimed "Size Matters was not only a more cohesive and confident return from the break-up than some of their contemporaries (looking at you, Prong, [and] lame-o supergroups), but also offered some killer live shows with Frank Bello on bass. It was and is a natural sequel to Aftertaste and a valiant fuck-you to the emo foppishness and Maidenesque fret-wankery that was invading metal at the time, despite it sharing emo’s preoccupation about women ruining your life."

Shortly after the release of their eight album Dead to the World, Page Hamilton reflected in an interview, "I would say that I like the first four albums best, Strap It On (1990) Meantime (1992), Betty (1994) and Aftertaste (1997), because they were created with the original line-up in a natural way. I still like those albums a lot. The comeback album, Size Matters, was also a great experience for me, but we had a lot of pressure on us because it was the first Helmet album after eight years."

Frank Bello has since spoken positively of his brief stint with Helmet. In a 2014 interview with Louder Sound, Bello reflected, "I went to go jam with Helmet for a year and a half of fucking the best fun. Page Hamilton, John Tempesta and Chris Traynor, we had a ball. Great musicians in that group — absolutely great musicians. And you know what? I think it made me a better bass player. It made me dig in with a pick, and it was a different form of playing for me. And I really enjoyed it."

Norma Jean vocalist Cory Brandon picked "See You Dead" and "Throwing Punches" as among the ten best Helmet songs in an article written for Louder Sound in 2017.

Track listing

Personnel
Credits adapted from Tidal.

Musicians
 Page Hamilton – vocals, guitar
 Chris Traynor – bass, guitar, vocals
 John Tempesta – drums, vocals
 Frank Bello – bass
 Rob Nicholson – vocals

Production
 Page Hamilton − producer
 Mark Renk − producer
 Jay Baumgardner − producer, mixer
 Charlie Clouser − producer
 Christopher Holmes – engineer
 Dan Certa – engineer
 Ryan Boesch – engineer

Chart positions

References

External links

2004 albums
Helmet (band) albums
Interscope Records albums
Albums produced by Charlie Clouser